Justin Thomas (born 1993) is an American professional golfer.

Justin Thomas may also refer to:

 Justin Thomas (rugby union) (born 1973), Welsh rugby player
 Justin Thomas (baseball) (born 1984), American baseball player
 Justin Thomas (American football) (born 1994), American football player

See also
 Justin Thomas Daly (born 1981), American musician, producer, songwriter and visual artist, known professionally as JT Daly